Lucas Röser (born 28 December 1993) is a German professional footballer who plays as a forward for SSV Ulm.

Career statistics

References

External links
 

Living people
1993 births
Sportspeople from Ludwigshafen
German footballers
Footballers from Rhineland-Palatinate
Association football forwards
2. Bundesliga players
3. Liga players
1. FSV Mainz 05 II players
TSG 1899 Hoffenheim II players
SG Sonnenhof Großaspach players
Dynamo Dresden players
1. FC Kaiserslautern players
Türkgücü München players
SSV Ulm 1846 players